The fourth season of the One Piece anime series was directed by Konosuke Uda and produced by Toei Animation. Like the rest of the series, it follows the adventures of Monkey D. Luffy and his Straw Hat Pirates. The first 17 episodes, dealing with Nefertari Vivi and the Straw Hats as they arrive in Alabasta to stop a civil war from happening, make up the  arc. The remaining episodes make up the  arc, in which the protagonists defeat Baroque Works and Nico Robin joins the crew. This season adapts the 18th to 24th volumes of the manga by Eiichiro Oda.

The fourth season originally ran from December 16, 2001, through October 27, 2002, on Fuji Television in Japan. The first half was released on DVD in six compilations, each containing one disc with two or three episodes, by Toei Animation between February 5 and July 2, 2003. The second half was released on DVD in seven compilations between August 6, 2003, and February 4, 2004. The season was then licensed and heavily edited for a dubbed broadcast and DVD release in English by 4Kids Entertainment. Their adaptation ran from February 25, 2006, though July 28, 2007, on Cartoon Network and, in contrast to the other seasons, also contained the same number of episodes as the original. Starting with the sixth season, Funimation took over dubbing new episodes for broadcast on Cartoon Network. Eventually they began redubbing the series from the start for uncut release on DVD and released the fourth season, relabeled as "One Piece: Season Two – Fourth Voyage", "One Piece Season Two – Fifth Voyage" and "One Piece: Season Two – Sixth Voyage", respectively, on December 15, 2009, January 19, 2010, and March 16, 2010.

The season makes use of six pieces of theme music: two opening themes and four ending themes. The first opening theme, "Believe", is performed by Folder5 in Japanese and Meredith McCoy in English and continues to be used as the first opening theme until the season’s 24th episode. Starting with episode 25 of the season, the second opening theme , performed by The Babystars in Japanese and Vic Mignogna in English was used. "Before Dawn", performed by Ai-Sachi in Japanese and Carli Mosier in English, continues to be used as the ending theme for the first two episodes. The second ending theme, from episodes 3-14, is "fish" performed by The Kaleidoscope in Japanese and Leah Clark in English. The fourth ending theme, used from episode 27 onwards, is "Shining Ray", performed by Janne Da Arc in Japanese and Justin Houston in English. 4Kids used original music for their version, while Funimation opted to use the original theme songs for their version.

Episode list

Home releases

Japanese

DVD

Blu-ray
The Eternal Log contains 16:9 versions of the episodes in standard definition Blu-ray format.

English
In North America, this season was recategorized as part of "Season Two" for its DVD release by Funimation Entertainment. The Australian Season Two sets were renamed Collection 8 through 10.

Notes

References

2001 Japanese television seasons
2002 Japanese television seasons
One Piece seasons
One Piece episodes